Augustine Daly may refer to:

 Augustin Daly (1838–1899), American drama critic, theatre manager and playwright
 Augustine J. Daly (died 1938), mayor of Cambridge, Massachusetts